Eva Margrét Kristjánsdóttir (born 17 January 1997) is an Icelandic basketball player for Keilor Thunder and the Icelandic national basketball team. She won the Icelandic championship with Snæfell in 2014 and the Icelandic Cup three times from 2021 to 2023 with Haukar. In 2022, she was named to the Úrvalsdeild Domestic All-First Team.

Playing career
Eva Margrét started her career with KFÍ in the 1. deild kvenna in 2010. In 2013, she signed with Snæfell and was a key member of its 2014 championship team. She returned to KFÍ for the 2014–2015 season when she was named the 1. deild Young Player of the Year.  

She joined Haukar in 2015. After sitting out the next two seasons, Eva Margrét returned to Haukar prior to the 2018–2019 season. She helped Haukar to the Icelandic Cup in September 2021, scoring 9 points in Haukar's 94–89 win against Fjölnir. The club repeated as Cup winners in March 2022, with Eva Margrét scoring 16 points in Haukar's 88–81 win against Breiðablik. During the  2021–2022 Úrvalsdeild season, she was named to the Úrvalsdeild Domestic All-First Team after helping Haukar to the Úrvalsdeild finals where the team lost to Njarðvík 2–3.

On 14 January 2023, she scored 11 points in Haukar's 94–66 win against Keflavík in the Icelandic Cup final.

In March 2023, Eva Margrét signed with Keilor Thunder of the Australian NBL1.

National team career
In 2011, Eva Margrét was selected to the Icelandic Under-15 national team and the following year to the Under-16 team. In 2014, she was selected to the 25 training group for the senior national team but was unable to attend. In October 2020, Eva Margrét debuted with the Icelandic national team.

References

External links
Profile at Icelandic Basketball Association

1997 births
Living people
Eva Margret Kristjansdottir
Eva Margret Kristjansdottir
Eva Margret Kristjansdottir
Eva Margret Kristjansdottir
Eva Margret Kristjansdottir
Eva Margret Kristjansdottir